Cerro de la Calavera (also known as Mount Calavera) is an  ancient plug dome volcano that last erupted 22 million years ago during the subduction of the Farallon Plate. It is located within the city of Carlsbad, California in the United States. Cerro de la Calavera is only one of three volcanic plugs in Southern California and can easily be seen from either northbound Interstate 5 at Cannon Road or westbound on Lake Boulevard. Cerro de la Calavera is located within the Lake Calavera Preserve offering county maintained trails that lead directly into the ancient volcano, making for great hiking adventures. Lake Calavera and the dam that holds it lie in the shadow of the mountain.

References

Carlsbad, California
Subduction volcanoes

Miocene lava domes